The 1970 Wyoming Cowboys football team represented the University of Wyoming in the 1970 NCAA University Division football season.  Led by ninth-year head coach Lloyd Eaton, they were members of the Western Athletic Conference (WAC) and played their home games on campus at War Memorial Stadium in Laramie.

A week before the season opener, starting quarterback Ed Synakowski drowned in a boating accident while fishing with his brother on Lake Hattie, just southwest of Laramie.

Wyoming entered this year with 22 consecutive home wins, which started with the opener of the 1965 season,  but the Cowboys lost all five games in Laramie in 1970.

Schedule

NFL Draft
One Cowboy was selected in the 1971 NFL Draft, which lasted seventeen rounds (442 selections).

Defensive end Tony McGee, a Cowboy in 1969, was selected in the third round and played in the NFL for 14 seasons.

References

External links
 Sports Reference – 1970 season – Wyoming Cowboys

Wyoming
Wyoming Cowboys football seasons
Wyoming Cowboys football